Ray Janssen (born July 5, 1937 in Hooper, Nebraska) served as a Nebraska state senator from Nickerson, Nebraska in the Nebraska Legislature from 1993 to 2009 and as a grocer. 

Janssen graduated from Hooper Public School. He was also in the U.S. Army. He was formerly the president of both Nickerson and Logan View school boards and is currently a member of the Nickerson volunteer fire department, Lions Club, and Hooper Commercial Club.

State legislature
Janssen was elected in 1992 to represent the 15th Nebraska legislative district. He was reelected in 1996, 2000, and 2004. He sat on the Revenue, Urban Affairs, and Building Maintenance committees and chaired the Revenue committee. In 2009, he was succeeded in the Legislature by his nephew, Charlie Janssen, who was elected to the 15th district seat in 2008.

References

1937 births
Living people
Democratic Party Nebraska state senators
People from Hooper, Nebraska